Nie Yali (born June 4, 1973 in Da'an, Zigong, Sichuan) is a Chinese field hockey player who competed in the 2000 Summer Olympics and in the 2004 Summer Olympics.

In 2000, she was part of the Chinese team which finished fifth in the women's competition. She played all seven matches as goalkeeper.

Four years later Nie finished fourth with the Chinese team in the women's competition. She played all six matches as goalkeeper.

External links
 
Profile at Yahoo! Sports

1973 births
Living people
Field hockey players at the 2000 Summer Olympics
Field hockey players at the 2004 Summer Olympics
Olympic field hockey players of China
Chinese female field hockey players
Female field hockey goalkeepers
People from Zigong
Asian Games medalists in field hockey
Sportspeople from Sichuan
Field hockey players at the 1998 Asian Games
Field hockey players at the 2002 Asian Games
Field hockey players at the 2006 Asian Games
Asian Games gold medalists for China
Asian Games bronze medalists for China
Medalists at the 1998 Asian Games
Medalists at the 2002 Asian Games
Medalists at the 2006 Asian Games